The 1953 Orange Bowl, part of the 1952 bowl game season, took place on January 1, 1953, at the Orange Bowl in Miami, Florida. The competing teams were the Alabama Crimson Tide, representing the Southeastern Conference (SEC) and the Syracuse Orangemen, competing as a football independent. Alabama won the game by a record margin of 61–6. The 55-point margin of victory remained the largest for a bowl game until the 2008 GMAC Bowl, and still stands as the largest margin of victory for an Alabama football team in a bowl game.

Teams

Alabama

The 1952 Alabama squad posted their best overall record the 1950s, finishing 9–2 leading into the postseason.  However, losses to Tennessee and Georgia Tech cost the Tide an SEC title. The day after defeating Maryland 27–7, Alabama accepted a bid to play in the Orange Bowl on New Years Day. The appearance marked the second for Alabama in the Orange Bowl, as they defeated Boston College 37–21 in the 1943 game.

Syracuse

The 1952 Syracuse squad finished the regular season with a record of 7–2 and as winners of the Lambert Trophy for the first time in school history. The Orangemen accepted a bid to play in the Orange Bowl after Navy declined the initial bid.

Game summary
Alabama opened the scoring on the afternoon with a 27-yard touchdown pass from Clell Hobson to Bobby Luna to take a 7–0 lead. Syracuse responded on the following possession with their lone points of the game on a 15-yard, Joe Szombathy touchdown run. After the extra point failed, the score was 7–6. The Orangemen did not score again while the Crimson Tide scored 54 unanswered points. Alabama extended their lead to 21–6 at the half with two touchdowns on a one-yard Bobby Marlow run and a 50-yard Thomas Tharp reception from Hobson. The scoring continued in the third quarter with three more touchdowns on a 38-yard Bobby Luna run and runs of one and 30-yards by Tommy Lewis. Leading 41–6, Alabama scored another three touchdowns in the fourth quarter on a 21-yard Joe Cummings reception from Bart Starr, an 80-yard Hootie Ingram punt return and a 60-yard Marvin Hill interception return.

The final score of 61–6 set an NCAA record for largest margin of victory in a bowl game, surpassing the previous record of 49 points set by Michigan in both the 1902 and 1948 Rose Bowl Games. The 55-point margin of victory stood as the all-time record for a bowl game through the 2008 GMAC Bowl where Tulsa defeated Bowling Green 63–7 for a 56-point margin of victory. The 55-points still stands as the largest margin of victory for an Alabama football team in a bowl game.

References

1952–53 NCAA football bowl games
1953
1953
1953
1953 in sports in Florida
January 1953 sports events in the United States